Viva or Viva! is an Indian pop girl group that formed in 2002, and has disbanded since. The band was composed of the winners of the first season of Indian version of the international television talent show Popstars, named Coke [V] Popstars, after its principal sponsors, Coca-Cola and music channel Channel [V].

The five original members were Seema Ramchandani, Pratichee Mohapatra, Neha Bhasin, Mahua Kamat, and Anushka Manchanda. However, Ramchandani left the group soon after the launch of their first album, VIVA! in 2002, to join the Art of Living Foundation. Ramchandani has released an art of living album which is an amalgamation of prayers from all religions.

They launched their second and last album Viva! - Reloaded in 2003.

Though there has been no official report about the group's split, they have not released an album since 2003, and the members have all embarked on solo careers.

In 2005, Pratichee Mohapatra released a solo album, titled With Love, Pratichee. The same year, Manchanda joined Channel [V] as a VJ, and has since become a playback singer for Hindi, Tamil language and Telugu language films. Bhasin also turned to playback singing in 2006. Mohapatra turned to acting and worked in the serial Mr. and Mrs. Mishra. Manchanda participated in the reality show Khatron Ke Khiladi.

They have also sung a song from Bollywood film Lakeer 'Rozana' composed by Academy Award winner A.R. Rahman and 'Quiero (Din Humara Hai)' from Rakht.

Discography 
2002: VIVA!
2003: Viva! - Reloaded

References

Indian girl groups
Indian pop music groups
Musicians from Pune
Musical groups established in 2002
2002 establishments in India
21st-century Indian women singers
21st-century Indian singers
Popstars winners